Mikkel Vestergaard (born 22 November 1992) is a retired Danish football forward.

Club career
Having played for Esbjerg since the age of 3, at the age of 16 he signed a youth contract with Esbjerg. By the age of 18 he signed his first professional contract with the club, keeping him at Esbjerg until 31 December 2014.

On 15 May 2011 he got his first team debut in a scoreless draw against AaB at Blue Water Arena, becoming the 6th youngest EfB debutant ever.

On 20 January 2016, Vestergaard signed a pre-contract with Viborg FF, applicable from the summer 2016.

Esbjerg and Viborg, however, negotiated a transition already on 25 January 2016, and the clubs reached an agreement so he could transfer with immediate effect instead of in the summer. He left Viborg at the end of the 2018/19 season.

On 30 August 2019, 26-year old Vestergaard announced that he would retire due to injuries.

International career
He has represented the Denmark U-18 team on 2 occasions.

In 2011, he was called up for the Denmark U-21 team, but didn't get any minutes on the pitch.

References

External links
 Mikkel Vestergaard on DBU
 

1992 births
Living people
Danish men's footballers
Esbjerg fB players
Viborg FF players
Danish Superliga players
Danish 1st Division players
Association football forwards